Jan Akkersdijk  ( – ) was a Dutch footballer.

Career
Akkersdijk played his club football for Velocitas in Breda.

He made his debut for the Netherlands in an April 1908 friendly match against Belgium and earned a total of 2 caps, scoring one goal which he scored in his final international against France. He was also part of the Dutch squad for the football tournament at the 1908 Summer Olympics, but he did not play in any matches.

International goals
Scores and results list. Netherlands' goal tally first.

See also
 List of Dutch international footballers

References

External links

1887 births
1953 deaths
Association football forwards
Dutch footballers
Netherlands international footballers
People from Semarang Regency